The Bob Newhart Show is an American sitcom television series produced by MTM Enterprises that aired on CBS from September 16, 1972, to April 1, 1978, with a total of 142 half-hour episodes over six seasons. Comedian Bob Newhart portrays a psychologist whose interactions with his wife, friends, patients, and colleagues lead to humorous situations and dialogue. The show was filmed before a live audience.

The credits feature the Cooper Black typeface, after it was made famous in 1966 by its use in the artwork for the Beach Boys Pet Sounds album.

Premise

The show centers on Robert "Bob" Hartley, PhD (Newhart), a Chicago psychologist. Most activity occurs between his work and home life, with his supportive, although occasionally sarcastic, wife Emily (Suzanne Pleshette), and their friendly but pesty neighbor, airline navigator Howard Borden (Bill Daily). The medical building where Bob's psychology practice is located also houses Jerry Robinson, D.D.S. (Peter Bonerz), an orthodontist whose office is on the same floor, and their receptionist, Carol Kester (Marcia Wallace), as well as a number of other somewhat eccentric doctors who appear on the show occasionally.

Bob's three most frequently seen regular patients are the cynical, mean-spirited and neurotic Elliot Carlin (Jack Riley), the milquetoast former US Marine cook Emil Peterson (John Fiedler), and quiet, reserved Lillian Bakerman (Florida Friebus), an older woman who spends most of her sessions knitting. Carlin was ranked 49th in TV Guides List of the 50 Greatest TV Characters of All Time, and Riley reprised the character in guest appearances on both St. Elsewhere and Newhart.

Most of the situations involve Newhart's character playing straight man to his wife, colleagues, friends, and patients. A frequent running gag on the show is an extension of Newhart's stand-up comedy routines, where he played one side of a telephone conversation, the other side of which is not heard. In a nod to this, for the first two seasons, the episodes opened with Bob answering the telephone by saying "Hello?". Emily routinely acts as straight woman to slow-witted Howard, and on occasion to Bob.

Cast

Stars
Bob Newhart as Dr. Robert Hartley, psychologist
Suzanne Pleshette as Emily (née Harrison) Hartley, his wife, a school teacher and later, assistant principal
Peter Bonerz as Dr. Jerry Robinson, Bob's friend, an orthodontist
Bill Daily as Howard Borden, Bob and Emily's next-door neighbor and friend, an airline navigator and later co-pilot
Marcia Wallace as Carol Kester, Bob and Jerry's receptionist

Bob's patients
Seen on a recurring basis in group therapy sessions.  Mr. Carlin, Mrs. Bakerman and Mr. Peterson were by far the most frequently seen patients.
Jack Riley as Elliot F. Carlin
Florida Friebus as Mrs. Lillian Bakerman
John Fiedler as Emil Peterson
Renée Lippin as Michelle Nardo (seasons 1-5)
Oliver Clark as Ed Herd (seasons 2-6)
Noam Pitlik as Victor Gianelli (seasons 1-2)
Daniel J. Travanti as Victor Gianelli (season 3)
Howard Hesseman as Craig Plager (seasons 2-6)
Lucien Scott as Edgar T. Vickers (seasons 2-3)
Merie Earle as Mrs. Loomis (seasons 2-3)
Rhoda Gemignani as Joan Rossi (seasons 2-3)
Michael Conrad as Mr. Trevesco (season 2)

Henry Winkler played patient Miles Lascoe in one season 2 episode, but was not a series regular.

Bob and Emily's relatives 
Seen very occasionally, except for Bob's sister in seasons 2-4.
Pat Finley as Ellen Hartley, Bob's sister (introduced near the end of season 2, and featured in nearly half of the episodes in season 3, the character was eventually dropped midway through season 4)
Martha Scott as Martha Hartley, Bob and Ellen's mother
Barnard Hughes as Herb Hartley, Bob and Ellen's father
John Randolph as Cornelius "Junior" Harrison Jr., Emily's father
Ann Rutherford as Aggie Harrison, Emily's mother

Neighbors, friends and others
Most of these were occasional or even one-shot characters.
Patricia Smith as Margaret Hoover, Emily's friend (seen only in the first part of season 1, then dropped)
Tom Poston as Cliff "The Peeper" Murdock, Bob's college friend from Vermont
Jean Palmerton as Corrine Murdock, "The Peeper's" wife
Moosie Drier as Howie Borden, Howard's son
Will Mackenzie as Larry Bondurant, Carol's boyfriend and later husband
Richard Schaal as Don Livingston (later Don Fesler), boyfriend/short-lived fiancé of Carol's; in the 1st season played Chuck Brock, husband of Nancy, who had previously been briefly engaged to Bob
Mariette Hartley as Marilyn Dietz, downstairs neighbor and friend of Emily's
Gail Strickland as Courtney Simpson, a girlfriend of Jerry's
Raul Julia as Dr. Greg Robinson, Jerry's brother
Heather Menzies as Debbie Borden, Howard's younger sister
William Redfield as Howard's brother, Gordon Borden, the game warden; the actor also appeared in the pilot episode as Margaret's husband Arthur Hoover

Rimpau Medical Arts Center
Doctors Tupperman and Newman were recurring characters; the others were mostly one-shots.
Larry Gelman as Dr. Bernie Tupperman, urologist
Howard Platt as Dr. Phil Newman, cosmetic surgeon
Shirley O'Hara as Debbie Flett, older, scatterbrained temp receptionist who constantly calls Bob "Dr. Ryan"
Gene Blakely as Dr. Ralph Tetzi, Ear/Nose/Throat specialist
Julie Payne as Dr. Sharon Rudell, who prefers "scream therapy" as a therapeutic device whenever she feels stressed
Tom Lacy as Dr. Stan Whelan
Paula Shaw as Dr. Tammy Ziegler
Ellen Weston as Dr. Sarah Harris
Kristina Holland as Gail Bronson, Carol's vacation replacement
Phillip R. Allen as Dr. Frank Walburn, another psychologist
Teri Garr as Miss Brennan, Dr. Walburn's receptionist

Episodes

The first four seasons of The Bob Newhart Show aired on Saturday nights at 9:30p.m. Eastern Standard Time. During the winter of the 1976–77 season, the program moved to 8:30p.m. EST. For its final season during 1977–78, the program moved to 8:00p.m. EST.

The program typically aired following The Mary Tyler Moore Show, which was also produced by MTM Enterprises.

Awards and honors
In 1977, the show received two Emmy nominations – for "Outstanding Comedy Series" and for Pleshette for "Outstanding Continued Performance by an Actress in a Comedy Series". Newhart, himself, was nominated twice for a Golden Globe Award as "Best TV Actor—Musical/Comedy" in 1975 and 1976. In 1997, the episodes "Over the River and Through the Woods" and "Death Be My Destiny" were respectively ranked No. 9 and No. 50 on TV Guide's 100 Greatest Episodes of All Time. TV Guide's 50 Greatest TV Shows of All Time listed it as No. 44.  In 2007, Time placed the show on its unranked list of "100 Best TV Shows of All-TIME".  Bravo ranked Bob Hartley 84th on its list of the 100 greatest TV characters.

In 2004, TV Land commemorated the show with a statue of Newhart in character as Dr. Hartley, seated and facing an empty couch, as if conducting a therapy session in his office.  The statue was temporarily installed in front of 430 North Michigan Avenue, the building used for exterior establishing shots of Hartley's office. The statue is now permanently located in the sculpture park adjacent to Chicago's Navy Pier entertainment complex.  In 2005, the TV Land Awards honored The Bob Newhart Show with its Icon Award, presented by Ray Romano.

In 2013, TV Guide ranked the series No. 49 on its list of the 60 Best Series of All Time.

Final episode
In the show's final episode, "Happy Trails to You," Bob gives up his psychology practice and accepts a teaching position at a small college in Oregon, with the Hartleys leaving Chicago, as well as their friends and neighbors, and Bob's patients, behind them. The closing scene, in which the cast exchange tearful goodbyes and embrace before bursting into an impromptu refrain of "Oklahoma," is a wry nod to The Mary Tyler Moore Show finale (also produced by MTM) from the previous year, in which the cast embraced and sang "It's a Long Way to Tipperary".

Later appearances by series charactersSt. Elsewhere (1985)

Jack Riley reprised his Elliot Carlin role on a 1985 episode of St. Elsewhere and partnered with Oliver Clark as the amnesiac John Doe Number Six. Carlin and Doe have been committed to the hospital's mental ward, where Carlin treats Doe with the same verbal abuse he directed toward Clark's "Mr. Herd" on The Bob Newhart Show. Carlin blames his insanity on an unnamed "quack in Chicago." While Oliver Clark's recurring portrayal of John Doe Number Six is essentially identical to Mr. Herd, the two are never stated to be the same individual. In a nod to the Mary Tyler Moore Show, John Doe Number Six addresses a character played by Betty White as Sue Ann Nivens, which Betty White's character denies.ALF (1987)

In the 1987 ALF episode entitled "Going Out of My Head Over You", Willie visits a psychologist, Dr. Lawrence "Larry" Dykstra, portrayed by Bill Daily. Jack Riley is in the waiting room, apparently portraying Elliot Carlin. Also in this episode, ALF mentions learning about psychology by watching episodes of The Bob Newhart Show.Newhart (1988 and 1990)

Riley appears in a 1988 episode of Newhart, playing an unnamed character who acts very much like Mr. Carlin. This character is being treated by the same therapist in Vermont whom Dick Loudon (Bob Newhart) visits for marriage counseling. Dick feels he recognizes Riley's character, but cannot place his face; whereupon the unnamed patient insults him. Echoing Carlin's statement from the 1985 St. Elsewhere, the therapist apologizes for her patient, explaining that it has taken her "years to undo the damage caused by some quack in Chicago."

Tom Poston, who played Cliff "The Peeper" Murdock, Bob's college friend from Vermont, played "George" the resident handyman from Vermont, throughout the Newhart series. Poston and Suzanne Pleshette married in 2001, with the marriage lasting until Poston's death in 2007. Pleshette died the following year.

Newhart and Pleshette reprised their roles from the show for the 1990 finale of Newhart, in which it was revealed that the entire Newhart series had just been Bob Hartley's dream. Bob and Emily awake in a room identical in appearance to their Chicago bedroom from The Bob Newhart Show. (This plot device had previously been used in the season five finale ("You're Having My Hartley") in which Emily is pregnant. At the end, the pregnancy is revealed to have been a dream.)The Bob Newhart Show: The 19th Anniversary Special (1991)

The entire cast assembled for the one-hour clip show The Bob Newhart Show: The 19th Anniversary Special in 1991, which finds the show's characters in the present day. This show is set in Chicago, in the same apartment and office that Bob Hartley had in his 1970s show. During the course of the show, the characters analyzed Bob's dream from the Newhart finale. At one point Howard recalled, "I had a dream like that once. I dreamed I was an astronaut in Florida for five years," as scenes from I Dream of Jeannie featuring Bill Daily as Roger Healey were shown.Murphy Brown (1994)

Newhart played Bob Hartley on Murphy Brown, in the episode "Anything But Cured" (March 14, 1994) to beg Carol (Marcia Wallace reprising her role from The Bob Newhart Show) to leave her job as Murphy's secretary and come back with him to Chicago.Saturday Night Live (1995)

Newhart reprised Hartley twice in the February 11, 1995, episode of Saturday Night Live. In one sketch, he appears on a satirical version of Ricki Lake, befuddled by Ms. Lake's dysfunctional guests and her armchair pop psychology. The episode ended with a repeat of Newhart’s "just a dream" scene, in which Bob Hartley again wakes up with Emily (Pleshette), and tells her that he just dreamed he had hosted SNL. Emily responds, "That show's not still on, is it?"George & Leo (1997)

George & Leo was a sitcom starring Bob Newhart and Judd Hirsch, and a 1997 episode called "The Cameo Episode" featured a raft of cameo appearances by their co-stars of previous series.  Although the actors were not necessarily playing the same characters as they played in the previous shows, there was certainly a suggestion with some of the unnamed characters that they could be.  Amongst the Bob Newhart Show actors making cameos in the episode were Peter Bonerz (as "Dr. Robins"), Oliver Clark, Bill Daily (as a pilot), John Fiedler, Tom Poston (as a police officer), Jack Riley, and Marcia Wallace.CBS at 75''' (2002)

Newhart and Pleshette, as "The Hartleys", were the hosts of a segment of the CBS at 75 broadcast.

Pop Culture: College campuses across the country routinely played beer drinking game named "Hi Bob". The name was used so often that it prompted a participant to take a sip of beer after each use of the phrase.

Home media
20th Century Fox Home Entertainment released the first four seasons of The Bob Newhart Show on DVD in Region 1 in 2005/2006.

On February 3, 2014, Shout! Factory announced it had acquired the rights to the series. It subsequently released The Bob Newhart Show: The Complete Series'' on May 27, 2014.  The fifth and sixth seasons were later released on DVD in individual sets on February 3, 2015.

See also
 Hi, Bob – a drinking game based on watching the show

References

External links

 The Bob Newhart Show at TVGuide.com
 I Laugh, therefore I am – The Quest for Bob Newhart's Apartment Building retrieved February 19, 2010
 

1972 American television series debuts
1978 American television series endings
1970s American sitcoms
1970s American workplace comedy television series
CBS original programming
English-language television shows
Psychotherapy in fiction
Television series about marriage
Television series by MTM Enterprises
Television shows set in Chicago